Pravex Bank is a private commercial bank based in Kyiv, the capital of Ukraine. Founded by Leonid Chernovetsky, it was licensed by the National Bank of Ukraine in 1992.

Pravex Bank was ranked the No.88 bank in terms of the size of retail loan portfolio by Ukraine's central bank as at 11 October 2016. In the environment of a booming retail lending business, the bank, which is privately held by local investors, has successfully managed to be among such heavyweights as RZB Aval, BNP Paribas and OTP. Its retail loan portfolio, at US$0.3bn, is close to that of the state-owned saving bank Oshchadbank (US$0.4bn), which was ranked No.7.

Pravex Bank was registered as a banking institution by National Bank of Ukraine in
December 1992. The bank was founded by local private entities and individuals.
Incorporated in the country's capital Kyiv, the bank started its business activities in the city and in the Kyiv Oblast (province). In 1993, the bank opened its first offices there.
Since its inception, the bank has served private entrepreneurs, SMEs and private individuals, providing them with services (at that time) such as credit cards (VISA, Eurocard/MasterCard, Diners Club), cash payments for home utilities bills, etc.
At the end of the 1990s, the bank started its regional expansion by opening offices in key
oblast centres and towns.
By the end of December 2005, Pravex Bank ran 406 offices scattered all over the
country. By February 2007, the network was extended to 520 offices in all 24
oblasts of the country and in the Autonomous Republic of Crimea. The bank's client base consists of 40,000
business entities and over 2M retail customers.
Pravex Bank is also an important precious metals trader in Ukraine.
Silvio Pedrazzi, Chairman  of the  Supervisory Board.  Taras Kyrychenko, Chairman of the Management Board.

Since 2008, the Bank belongs to the Intesa Sanpaolo Group.

Interesting facts 
 Former lawyer of this bank Iryna Mudra became later Deputy Minister of Justice of Ukraine.

See also 

List of banks in Ukraine

References 

Banks of Ukraine
Economy of Kyiv
Intesa Sanpaolo subsidiaries